Jieni may refer to several villages in Romania:

 Jieni, a village in Șimnicu de Sus Commune, Dolj County
 Jieni, a village in Rusănești Commune, Olt County

See also
 Shao Jieni, a Chinese-born Portuguese table tennis player